Bhadrakali (IAST: Bhadrakālī), also known as Mahakali and Kali, is a Hindu goddess. 

According to Shaktism, she is one of the fierce forms of the Supreme Goddess Shakti, or Adi Parashakti, mentioned in the Devi Mahatmyam. In Vaishnavism, Bhadrakali is among the many epithets of Yogamaya, the internal potency of illusion of the preserver deity, Vishnu. According to several Puranas, Bhadrakali is a form of the goddess Parvati. She is worshipped in Kerala as Bhagavati, Mahakali, Chamunda, Sree Kurumba, and Kariam Kali Murti. She is purported to be the auspicious and fortunate form of Mahakali who protects the good, known as Bhadra.

Etymology
In Sanskrit, Bhadra means auspicious. Another interpretation of this name is that Bhadra comes from 'Bha' and 'dra', The letter 'Bha' means 'delusion' or 'Maya'and 'dra' is used as a superlative i.e. meaning 'the most/the greatest etc.' which makes the meaning of Bhadra as Maha Maya.

In other words, maya represents the illusion of the samsara we are in, and worshipping of Bhadrakali is thought of getting liberated from this maha maya. This can be seen with the head that she holds in her hand - the chopped head and the sickle represents that Bhadrakali gives liberation (i.e., liberates ourselves of our own ego, hence the chopped head).

Iconography 
This goddess is represented with three eyes, and four, sixteen, or eighteen hands. She carries a number of weapons, with flames flowing from her head, and a small tusk protruding from her mouth. Her worship is also associated with the Tantric tradition of the Matrikas as well as the tradition of the ten Mahavidyas and falls under the broader umbrella of Shaktism.

Forms

Bhadrakali is primarily worshipped in four forms: Darikajit (as the killer of the demon Darika), Dakshajit (as the killer of Daksha), Rurujit (as the slayer of the demon Ruru) and as Mahishajit (as she who killed Mahishasura). There are at least five traditional versions regarding the origin-incarnations or avatar of Bhadrakali:

Darikajit 
In Kerala, where the worship of Bhadrakali is prevalent even today, she is worshipped most commonly as "Darikajit," the slayer of Darika, based on a story that originated in the Markandeya Purana, and is called the "Bhadrakali Mahatmyam" or "Darika-vadham".

The asura Darika was said to have a very chaste wife, Manodari, who had in her possession a special mantra that would keep her husband invincible, and thus her marriage forever safe. Darika used his newfound invincibility to torment the lokas and usurp the kingdom of the devas. When Shiva learned of the demon Darika's misdeeds, he opened his fiery third eye and the massive ferocious form of Bhadrakali emerged. Shiva ordered Bhadrakali to destroy Darika, with a Vetala as her vehicle.

However, the goddess found it impossible to kill the demon as he was ever in the protection of his wife's mantra chanting. The goddess split her form into that of her fierce warrior self that continued to engage in combat and that of a common woman. The goddess went to Manodari, claiming to be the wife of a soldier who was fighting for Darika in his army in the losing battle. With this, Manodari broke her chanting to console the worried woman, breaking Darika's invincibility shield. Kali immediately disappeared from Manodari's presence while on the battlefield she had already managed to injure Darika.

As Darika lay at her feet, about to be killed, he was said to have appealed to her motherly nature as a last resort, with faux praises and prayers. But the devas gathered there began to sing praises to the goddess (such as the mantra "Kante Kalatmaje Kaali, Kante Kali Namostute"), thus reminding the goddess of the atrocities Darika had committed that caused her birth in the first place. Turning a blind eye to Darika's faux innocence, Bhadrakali severed his head and held it aloft in her left hand as she danced around on the battlefield.

But her anger would not succumb and so the devas invoked Shiva to intervene and calm Kali down, as when in anger Kali had the tendency to reduce the universe into nothingness. Shiva lay in her path as a crying baby and this time (Gandakarna), Kali's true motherliness was awakened. A now calm Kali expressed her wish to stay at the spot and protect the local people till the end of time. The spot where she remained is said to be the Kodungallur Bhagavathy Temple. Bhadrakali at Kodungallur remains one of her 3 most auspicious temples in Kerala, along with Thirumandhamkunnu Temple and Parumala Valiya Panayannarkavu Devi Temple. It is also listed as one of the 13 'kaavu' temples of Kali and as one of the main 64 Bhadrakali temples in Kerala.

Chamundi 
Another version of the Bhadrakali story is from the Devi Mahatmyam of the Markandeya Purana, during the battle between Raktabija and goddess Kaushiki (Durga). Kali was born from the wrath of goddess Kaushiki, from her forehead. She slew Chanda and Munda and earned the epithet 'Chamundi'. She also slayed the demon Raktabija, which is her most famous feat. This Chamundi-Kali form is said to be the leader of the Sapta-Matrikas and is the most popular form of the goddess in Northern India.

Dakshajit 
Another popular story on Bhadrakali is associated with Daksha and his yajna, according to the Shiva Purana, Vayu Purana and the Mahabharata. Goddess Bhadrakali was born from the matted locks of Shiva's hair. He ordered her to free Veerabhadra who was imprisoned by Vishnu, as the latter was protecting Daksha. She succeeds and is later heard of as assisting in Daksha's assassination, and hence earned the title 'Dakshajit'.

Mahishajit 
According to the Kalika Purana, Bhadrakali is said to have appeared in Treta Yuga to slay the 2nd out of the 3 Mahishasuras. It is believed that when the third Mahishasura wished to know how he would die, he was given a vision of the fair-skinned Bhadrakali who rose out of the milky ocean and slew him in his previous incarnation. He asked to die again at her hands and the goddess promised that she would incarnate as the eighteen-armed Mahishasura Mardini (the account detailed in the Devi Mahatmyam) and slay him. This version of Bhadrakali is worshiped as 'Mahishajit'.

Rurujit 
According to the Varaha Purana, the goddess Roudri (incarnation of mother Parvati) was meditating at the foot of the Neeli mountain. She came across the devas who were fleeing, unable to bear the atrocities of the demon Ruru. Angered by the injustice she witnessed, Roudri created Bhadrakali from the embers of her rage and sent her to kill Ruru. Bhadrakali successfully did so and was awarded the epithet 'Rurujit'.

Devi 
According to Tantra Rahasya, the feminine form of the divine (Devi) arose from the North (Uttaramnaya) face (Amnayas) of Shiva, which is blue in color and with three eyes, as Dakshinakalika, Mahakali, Guhyakah, Smashanakalika, Bhadrakali, Ekajata, Ugratara, Taritni, Katyayani, Chhinnamasta, Nilasarasvati, Durga, Jayadurga, Navadurga, Vashuli, Dhumavati, Visalakshi, Gauri, Bagalamukhi, Pratyangira, Matangi, and Mahishamardini.

Worship

According to Kerala traditions, the events described in the Markandeya Purana associated with Bhadrakali (her slaying of the demon Darika to liberate the universe from the evil) took place in Kerala, near Madayi in the Kannur District. Bhadrakali temples in Kerala commemorate this event during traditional festivals and Bhadrakali is worshipped as the daughter of Shiva, from whose third eye she sprung to defeat the demon. According to the Markandeya Purana, her worship purifies the devotee and grants liberation from the cycle of birth and death. She is seen to protect the honour of women and to bestow all spiritual knowledge. In Kerala, she called Virabhadra her "brother" and refused to be treated by him when she was attacked by the deity Vasoorimala, who had marked her face with smallpox. She said that a brother must not touch the face of his sister. Thus, mild pockmarks are sometimes visible on her face in some Keralite depictions of her.

Among the people of the neighboring states, especially in Tamil Nadu, this form of Shakti is known as 'Malayala Bhagavathy' or 'Malayala Bhadrakali', who provides protection to her devotees irrespective of caste and religion.

In Tamil Nadu, Karnataka, Andhra Pradesh and the Southern Travancore area of Kerala, especially in the city of Thiruvananthapuram, the Tamil, Kannada and Telugu speaking communities worship a form of Mahakali as 'Ujjaini Mahakali', and they consider Emperor Vikramaditya as their first teacher in this spiritual tradition as having established the tradition in the South.

In other parts of India, the Tantric name 'Kali' or 'Mahakali' is generally more popular as the consort of Shiva in his form of Rudra or Mahakala, and Bhadrakali is identified as Durga's daughter who helped her during the battle with Raktabija. Other sources state that she is the sister of Virabhadra, who was himself born of the wrath of Shiva as Rudra, and that she is the consort of a form of Mahakala or Bhairava. The deeply Tantric-influenced traditions mostly consider 'Kali' as the consort of Shiva.

Family deity 

Hindu communities in Kerala, Southern Karnataka and Southern Tamil Nadu including the Ezhavas, Billavas, Kodavas, Nadars, Namboodhiris, Moosathu Brahmins and Nairs, worship Bhadrakali as their family deity (Paradevata). They worship certain weapons in their temples which they believe to be the weapons used by the goddess. The Kuladevata or community deity of Kudumbi community is Kodungalluramma, the mother goddess of Kodungallur. Kodungallur Bhagavathy Temple is one of the most famous temples in Kerala, dedicated to Bhadrakali. During the 'Thalappoli' festival, which is celebrated mainly on Makar Sankranti, Kudumbi people from all over the state (mainly Malabar, Tulunad, Kodaka) come to the temple. Many temples of Thiyyas in Northern Kerala and South Karnataka are called the Kali Sree Kurumba, Cheermba, Paradevata. According to Castes and Tribes of Southern India by Edgar Thurston, Bhadrakali is the prime deity of Ezhavas of Travancore. According to the Nadar Community of Tamilnadu, there were seven children born to Devarishis and Devakanyas. They gave their children to Bhadrakali. She took them and gave milk to the children.The progenies of these children are today believed to be the ancestors of the Nadar community. She is considered as the mother of Nadars. The Nadars also claim that they are the descendants of Bhadrakali. A Bhadrakali temple is usually at the centre of almost every Nadar settlement. Bhadrakali is also the tutelary deity of the Nadar community of Tamil Nadu. Kanyakubja Brahmins with roots in Bhadras, Kanpur worship her as their Kuladevi. The place is called Bhadras because of the presence of a very old Bhadra Kali Temple.

Other legends 
According to legends, the famous Indian Sanskrit poet Kalidasa became what he was thanks to the divine will of Bhadrakali. Another legend states that the emperor Vikramaditya and his brother Bhatti were also ardent devotees of Bhadrakali, whose blessings resulted in all the success showered upon them. Vikramaditya also helped to establish small wayside Bhadrakali temples and prayer centers for pilgrims in many parts of Southern India, especially in Tamil Nadu. The devotional traditions focused around these small temples exist even today.

Art
It is believed Bhadrakali protects the practitioners of Kalarippayattu, a traditional martial arts form. In Malabar, it is believed that all the victories of Thacholi Othenan and other martial artists were due to the blessings of Bhadrakali of the Lokanarkavu Temple, also known as 'The Shaolin Temple of Malayalees'. Most traditional villages in Kerala have their own Kalari, the ancient martial arts schools and local temples dedicated to Bhadrakali associated with them. Among Tamils, Bhadrakali is equally important as the patron deity of traditional martial arts and a guardian of all law-abiding citizens.
Kerala has a tradition of folk artist rituals and dances associated with worship of Devi in the form of Bhadrakali. These rituals are performed in places of worship called Kavu (roughly translated as grove) or in small temples. Besides the general welfare of the village, these rituals aim at warding off of such calamities like smallpox and other epidemic diseases. The ritual themes generally revolve around the triumph of Bhadrakali over the demon Darika and other evil characters.

The dance forms are:
Theyyam
Theeyattu
Padayani
Poothanumthirayum
Mudiyettu
Kuthiyottam
Kettukazcha
Apindi Vilakku or alpindivilakku
Thira

Temples

Haryana
[shaktipeeth Shri Devikoop[Bhadrakali Temple]]  is a temple situated in thanesar, jhansa road, Kurukshetra,haryana.Shaktipeeth Shri Devikoop Bhadrakali Mandir is also known as “Savitri Peeth”, “Devi Peeth”, “Kalika Peeth” or “Aadi Peeth”. the most iconic thing of temple is when the sati abolished the hawan of daksha his father .the shiva in his fierce form took the godess on his shoulder and was started doing "Tandava" the dance of destruction . Our Scriptures say that unable to stand slander and calumny let loose on her husband, Lord Shiva, Devi Bhagwati laid down her life and became a ‘Sati’. Clasping her holy dead body to his heart, the distraught Shiva started pacing all over the universe. Watching all this, Lord Vishnu cut her dead body with his ‘Sudarshan chakra’ into 52 parts. In this way, the places where these parts fell, emerged as sacred “Shaktipeeth”. All this was done for general good of one and all. Naina Devi, Jwala ji, Kamkhya ji etc are among the 52 holy Shaktipeethas. It is believed that right ankle of Maa Sati fell down at Shaktipeeth Shri Devikoop Bhadrakali Mandir in Kurukshetra. The legend has it that before marching out for the battle of Mahabharta, the Pandvas along with Lord Krishna offered worship here praying for their victory and donated the horses of their Chariots which made it an age-old tradition of offering horses made of silver, mud etc, depending upon one’s means, once the desire have been met. The Tonsure (head shaving) ceremony of Shri Krishna & Balram was also performed at this Shaktipeeth Shri Devikoop Bhadrakali Mandir.

Nepal
 Bhadrakali Temple is in Kathmandu, Nepal. It is near the Sahid Gate. The temple is at the eastern side of Tundikhel. This temple is also known as Shree Lumadhi Bhadrakali. It is one of the most renowned “Shaktipith” of Nepal. A form of the goddess Kali, Bhadrakali in Sanskrit means “blessed, auspicious, beautiful and prosperous” and she is also known as “Gentle Kali”. Another name for the goddess is Lazzapith.
Bhadrakali Temple, is a temple on the East of Pokhara in Kundahar, atop a small hill. It is dedicated to the goddess Kali.

Himachal Pradesh
 Bhadrakali mata temple at village Kolar tehsil Paonta Sahib, district Sirmour, Himachal Pradesh. It is 22 km from paonta sahib on NH72. The idol in this temple is huge. The temple is being visited by pilgrims. Hindu labana caste worship Maa bhadarkali.
Himachal Pradesh, Basohli, now placed in LACMA Museum (M.72.53.7)

Gujarat
 Ahmedabad, Gujarat. It is believed that she protects the city, hence the position of the temple is near the city fort.
 Bhadran in Anand district.

Jharkhand 
 Bhadrakali temple at Itkhori, Chatra. It is 35 km on the East of Chatra and 16 km west of Chauparan connected with Grand Trunk Road Along with the temple situated on the bank of river Mahanada (Mahane), surrounded by hill and forest, there is a water reservoir.

Karnataka
Shri Bhadrakali Temple, Mutharmudi
South Kodagu
Sree Bhadrakali Amma Temple, Bellur- Hudikeri, South Kodagu
Shree Prasanna Bhadrakaali Devi Temple, Gejjagadahalli, DasanaKarakulami, Shivanapura Post, Off Tumakuru Road, Bengaluru 562123
Shree Shasithilu Chirumbha Bhagavathi temple, Mangalore

Kerala

 Kodungallur Bhagavathy Temple, Thrissur, Kerala; is one of the oldest temple in India built during the Sangam age. Mahodayapuram (Kodungallur) was the capital of the Chera Empire which ruled Kerala. Shri Bhadrakali in her fierce form is worshipped along with Mahadevar(Siva) and Saptamathrukkal.
 Vellayani Devi Temple, Trivandrum, Kerala. One of the most famous Bhadrakali temple, situated at Vellayani, Trivandrum, Kerala conducting longest non-pilgrimage festival in India (60 days of festival once in 3 years). Idol in this temple is very huge and made up of pure gold.  Temple is very ancient and it is calculated as 800 years old. The temple is entirely different from other temples due to its traditional rituals.
 Thiruvarkadu Bhagavaty Temple in Payangadi, Kannur, Kerala is the first and foremost Bhadrakali Temple at a place believed to be the fortress of Darukasura. Bhadrakali beheaded Darika here. The Shakteya Sampradaya pooja is well known here. It is done by Bhattarakas (Pidararas) who are migrant priests from Kashmir and Bengal. The idol of Bhadrakali is around 6 feet tall and is portrayed in the form of slaying Daruka. Tiruvarkattu Bahagavaty Temple is famous for the removal of black magic.
 Chettikulangara Devi Temple, near Mavelikkara, Kerala.
 Kalarivathukkal Temple, Kannur, Kerala; the fierce form of Bhadrakali, as the mother of the martial art Kalaripayattu. Theyyam the folk dance in Malabar starts with the permission of the Chirakkal Raja and the final theyyam in entire Kerala is in Kalarivathukkal Temple. The rituals are in Sakteya method.
Thoniyakavu Bhadrakali Temple in the village of Puthenpeedika, of Kerala state, India
 Malayalappuzha Devi Temple, in Pathanamthitta
 Panayannarkavu, near Mavelikkara, Kerala
 Paramekkavu Bagavathi Temple in Thrissur.

 Pathiyanadu Sree Bhadrakali Temple – a famous revered shrine in Kerala, India. The shrine is in Mullassery.
 Pattupurackal Bhagavathy temple, Vadakkenirappu, Njeezhoor, Kottayam, Kerala
 Pattupurakkavu Bhagavathi Temple, Pandalam
 Sarkaradevi Temple Sarkara, Chirayinkeezh, Thiruvananthapuram, Kerala ( Sree Sarkara Devi Temple is one of the oldest Bhadrakali temple in Kerala. Sarkara Pongala, Sarkara Kaliyoottu and Sarkara Bharani are famous festivals in this temple.These three festivals are with in two months in every year ! Lakhs of people participates in these three festivals.
 Thirumandhamkunnu Temple at Angadippuram, Kerala; A famous temple of Shri Bhadrakali, Ganesha near bagawathy is for child and marriage.
 Thirumandhamkunnu Temple, angadipuram, malappuram dist
 Thrikkariyoor Kottekkavu Bhagavathi Temple at Kottappady near Kothamangalam one of the oldest of kali temples and famous for the Muduyet ritual held once in every 12 years  "Garudan Thookkam on "Meena Bharani","Sathrutha samhara pooja" and "."Rakhshassinum sarpathinum padmamittu nivediam".
 Vazhappully temple, Vazhappully Temple in Thrissur, Kerala is a Hindu Temple famous for Guruthi Pooja for goddess Kali. Guruthi Pooja at Vazhappully Temple is offered for the fierce form of goddess Kali at Night. During Guruthi pooja the guruthi is offered to the goddess. Guruthi is a creamed mixture of Turmeric, slaked lime and other pooja ingredients. Guruthi represents blood which is vitality.
 Manakkattu Bhadra Temple, Chirakkadavu in Kottayam, Kerala which is famous for being among the rarest Bhadrakali temples having daily Guruthi Pooja. Major pitstop for Sabarimala pilgrims.

Madhya Pradesh
Ma Bhadrakali Temple Ujjain
Ma Bhadrakali Temple, Badaura Kala in Chhatarpur District

Maharashtra
Shree Sateri Bhadrakali Temple, Aronda Savantwadi Taluka, Sindhudurg District, Maharashtra.

Mata Bhadrakali Temple, Nashik City, Nashik District, Maharshtra.

Odisha
 Bhadrakali Temple in village Aharapada, 8 km away from Bhadrak, Bhadrak district

Rajasthan
 Kalika Mata Temple, Chittorgarh

 Bhadrakali Temple, Hanumangarh: Situated in Hanumangarh District, Rajasthan. One of the oldest temple of Maa Bhadrakali, Constructed by Maharaja Ganga Singh

Tamil Nadu

 Anthiyur, Erode District, Bhadrakali Amman Kovil.
 Coimbatore, Mettupalayam, Arulmigu Vana-Bhadrakali Amman Kovil.
 Kanyakumari :- Sri Bhadreshwari Amman Temple at Kannathankuzhi- an old and powerful temple worshipped and being managed by Nadar family of Pandaram Nadar, Maathan, Sangili, Padmanabhan, Perumal, Ponnammal-Ponnumuthu, Rajamani and Kochappi Nadars and their heirs. Annual festival held in every year in the month of Panguni and thousands of Nadar families used to worship the goddess.
 Madurai, Madapuram, sri bhadrakaliamman kovil.
 Nagapattinam, Sri Maha Ruthrakaliyammbal Temple - Chithra Pournami Thiruvizha
 Rajapalayam, pachamadam, Arulmigu pachamadam Bhadrakali Amman Kovil .
 sivagangai, kolangudi, sri vettudayar kaliamman kovil.
 Sivakasi, Arulmigu Bhadrakali Amman Kovil. 
 Thoothukudi, Poobalarayerpuram, Arulmigu Bhadrakali Amman Kovil – Amman kodai – Chithirai Last Tuesday, Dasara Car Festival.
 Thoothukudi, Sivagnanapuram, Arulmigu Bhadrakali Amman Kovil – Amman kodai – Avani First Tuesday, Samy kodai – Panguni First Friday.
 Thoothukudi, sindhalakarai, sri vekkaliamman kovil.
 Tenkasi, surandai, Arulmigu Bhadrakali Amman Kovil.
 Trichy, oorayur, sri vekkaliamman kovil.
 Vadamattam - 612201, Near Kumbakonam, Arulmigu Sree Vadapathirakali, facing north with Hongara roopam, Perumal molavar.
Chengalpattu, Hanumanthapuram, Pidari Badhra Kaliamman Koil
Madurai, Veeralampatti, Badrakalli Amman temple.
Palamedu, Madurai, Pathirakalli Amman temple
Ramanathapuram, Thamaraikulam, sri bhadrakali amman temple - Folk festival - puratasi month navratri days
Sree Bhadrakali Temple at Kollamcode- Famous For Thookam Offering it celebrated on Malayalam Month Meenam.
Sree Bhagavathi Temple at Mandaikkadu- Famous For Mandaikkadu Koda. Celebrated on the Malayalam Month Kumbham. Local Holiday given by collector on Kaniyakumari District.
Theni Pathirakalipuram, Pathirakalipuram Arulmigu Bhadrakali Amman Kovil – Amman kodai – Chithirai 3rd Tuesday.

Telangana
 Bhadrakali Temple in Warangal, Telangana.  Bhadrakali (Maha Kali Mata) was the principal deity of the Hindu Kakatiya kingdom of Warangal (Orugallu or Ekasila nagaram) that ruled most of Andhra Pradesh during that period.  Rituals and animal (and human, by some accounts) sacrifices on a large scale were performed to invoke the blessings of goddess Bhadrakali before the Kakatiya warriors went off for battle. As per the writings on the temple wall this temple is believed to be constructed by the King Pulakeshin II of Chalukya dynasty around 625 CE.

Uttar Pradesh 
 Bhadrakali temple is in Bhadras,  Ghatampur, Kanpur.

Uttarakhand
  Bhadrakali Temple, Banspatan-Kanda road, Kanda, Uttarakhand, District Bageshwar, Uttarakhand.An ancient temple situated near a scenic waterfall. Pant Brahmins from Khantoli are the traditional priests.

West Bengal
 Kalighat Kali Temple, Kalighat Kali Temple is a Hindu temple in West Bengal, India dedicated to the Hindu goddess Kali. It is one of the 51 Shakti Peethas. The temple is visited by pilgrims from all over India irrespective of sectarian differences. Kalighat is also associated with the worship offered to Kali by a Dasanami Monk by name Chowranga Giri, and the Chowringee area of Calcutta is said to have been named after him.

References

External links

Dictionary of Hindu Lore and Legend by Anna Dallapiccola
 Maha Kshethrangalude Munnil, D. C. Books, Kerala
 Kodimatha Pallipurathu Kavu Bhagavathy Temple Kerala | Kerala Pilgrim Centers

Tamil deities
Hindu goddesses